Dialogues with Madwomen is a 1993 documentary by Allie Light focusing on mental illness in women. It was later aired on television on the PBS series POV.

Synopsis
In Dialogues with Madwomen, filmmakers Allie Light and Irving Saraf have seven "madwomen" — including Light herself — into telling their stories. Using a mixture of home movies, archival footage of psychiatric wards, re-enactments, and interviews with their subjects, Light and Saraf have created a complex, moving portrait of women in whom depression, schizophrenia, and multiple personalities coexist with powerful, sometimes inspired levels of creativity.

See also
Atypical antipsychotics, which came onto the market after this film was made

Karen Wong
In December 2013, a man whose DNA linked him to Karen Wong, one of the seven women in the film, was found guilty and convicted for her murder. His conviction was later overturned.

References

External links
Film review and awards
Film history and an interview

1993 films
Sundance Film Festival award winners
Documentary films about mental health
American documentary films
Documentary films about women
1993 documentary films
1990s English-language films
1990s American films